The high performance supercomputing program started in mid-to-late 1980s in Pakistan. Supercomputing is a recent area of Computer science in which Pakistan has made progress, driven in part by the growth of the information technology age in the country. Developing on the ingenious supercomputer program started in 1980s when the deployment of the Cray supercomputers was initially denied.

The fastest supercomputer currently in use in Pakistan is developed and hosted by the National University of Sciences and Technology at its modeling and simulation research centre. As of November 2012, there are no supercomputers from Pakistan on the Top500 list.

Background

The initial interests of Pakistan in the research and development of supercomputing began during the early 1980s, at several high-powered institutions of the country. During this time, senior scientists at the Pakistan Atomic Energy Commission (PAEC) were the first to engage in research on high performance computing, while calculating and determining exact values involving fast-neutron calculations.

According to one scientist involved in the development of the supercomputer, a team of the leading scientists at PAEC developed powerful computerized electronic codes, acquired powerful high performance computers to design this system and came up with the first design that was to be manufactured, as part of the atomic bomb project. However, the most productive and pioneering research was carried out by physicist M.S. Zubairy at the Institute of Physics of Quaid-e-Azam University.  Zubairy published two important books on Quantum Computers and high-performance computing throughout his career that are presently taught worldwide.  In 1980s and 1990s, the scientific research and mathematical work on the supercomputers was also carried out by mathematician Dr. Tasneem Shah at the Kahuta Research Laboratories while trying to solve additive problems in Computational mathematics and the Statistical physics using the Monte Carlo method. In 1990s, the Khan Research Laboratories deployed a series of supercomputer systems at its site, becoming nation's one of the first fastest computers at that time. Technological imports in supercomputers were denied to Pakistan, as well as India, due to an arms embargo, as the foreign powers feared that the imports and enhancement to the supercomputing development was a dual use of technology and could be used for developing nuclear weapons in 1990s.

During the Bush administration, in an effort to help US-based companies gain competitive ground in developing information technology-based markets, the U.S. government eased regulations that applied to exporting high-performance computers to Pakistan and four other technologically developing countries. The new regulations allowed these countries to import supercomputer systems that were capable of processing information at a speed of 190,000 million theoretical operations per second (MTOPS); the previous limit had been 85,000 MTOPS.

List of  organizations Supercomputers in Pakistan

Supercomputing programs

University of Malakand

Developed Supercomputer in CCMS Department of Physics, University of Malakand. It is heavily used by Graduate Students, PhD Scholars and Faculty Members of UOM as well as Researchers from other organizations. It is operational since 2016 and its performance and configuration can be monitored from the link:

http://hpc.uom.edu.pk

It has 2-servers used as Head Nodes and 24-machines used as Compute Nodes.
It has been mostly used for Simulation and Modeling by the Researchers of Materials Science and Chemistry Departments.

GIK Institute

The Ghulam Ishaq Khan Institute of Engineering Sciences and Technology (GIKI) has nation's notable supercomputer programmes.

This facility has been funded by Directorate of Science and Technology (DoST), Government of Khyber Pakhtunkhwa, Pakistan in 2012 under supervision of Dr. Masroor Hussain. This system provides a test bed for shared memory systems, distributed memory systems and Array Processing using OpenMP, MPI-2 and CUDA specifications, respectively. It is a compute-intensive platform and consisted of the following hardware components:

 Front Node: Dell R815 with 64 CPU cores, 256GB RAM, 1.8TB Secondary Memory 
 3 Compute Nodes: Dell R715 each with 32 CPU cores per compute node  (96 in total), 128GB RAM per compute node (384GB in total), 600GB Secondary Memory/ compute node (1.8TB in total) 
 NVIDIA Tesla M2090 Graphical Processing Unit (GPU) with 1024 GPU cores: This facility may be used for an emerging paradigm of parallel computing which uses GPUs as computing units, which connected to Front Node 
 Dell Power Connect 8024F layer-3 manageable switch: Front Node and the Compute Nodes are connected to each other using this switch. It provides an enormous data transfer rate of 10Gbit/s among the connected entities using fibre channels
 Software: To make the hardware layer parallel-computation-capable, Rocks Cluster 6.1 (Emerald Boa) over CentOS has been installed and configured along with CUDA roll

COMSATS

The COMSATS Institute of Information Technology (CIIT) has been actively involved in research in the areas of parallel computing and computer cluster systems. In 2004, CIIT built a cluster-based supercomputer for research purposes. The project was funded by the Higher Education Commission of Pakistan. The Linux-based computing cluster, which was tested and configured for optimization, achieved a performance of 158 GFLOPS. The packaging of the cluster was locally designed.

NUST

The National University of Sciences and Technology (NUST) in Islamabad has developed the fastest supercomputing facility in Pakistan till date. The supercomputer, which operates at the university's Research Centre for Modeling and Simulation (RCMS), was inaugurated in September 2012. The supercomputer has parallel computation abilities and has a performance of 132 teraflops per second (i.e. 132 trillion floating-point operations per second), making it the fastest graphics processing unit (GPU) parallel computing system currently in operation in Pakistan.

It has multi-core processors and graphics co-processors, with an inter-process communication speed of 40 gigabits per second. According to specifications available of the system, the cluster consists of a "66 NODE supercomputer with 30,992 processor cores, 2 head nodes (16 processor cores), 32 dual quad core computer nodes (256 processor cores) and 32 Nvidia computing processors. Each processor has 960 processor cores (30,720 processor cores), QDR InfiniBand interconnection and 21.6 TB SAN storage."

KRL

In 1990s, the Kahuta Research Laboratories (KRL) became nation's first site and a home of a number of the most high-performance supercomputer and parallel computing systems that were installed at the facility by a team of mathematicians. A parallel Computational Fluid Dynamics (CFD) division was established which specialized in conducting high performance computations on shock waves in the blast effects from the outer surface to the inner core by using the difficult differential equations of the state of the materials under high pressure.

KUST
The Kohat University of Science and Technology installed a supercomputer facility with the specifications of Cluster.

Riphah International University
On 22 January 2016, Riphah International University based in Islamabad announced that their team of engineers have developed a supercomputer architecture. The system supports CUDA, MPI/LAM, OpenMP, OpenCL and OpenACC programming models. It also can solve larger algorithms, numerical techniques, big data, data mining, bioinformatics and genomics, business intelligence and analytics, climate, and weather and ocean related problems.

UCERD Private Limited
UCERD Private Limited proposed and developed Pakistan's 1st FPGA-Powered Supercomputer.

In 2019, the UCERD team has won HEC Technology Development Fund of Rs. 16 Million for the Project "Development of Scalable Heterogeneous Supercomputing System"

See also

 Supercomputing in China
 Supercomputing in Europe
 Supercomputing in India
 Supercomputing in Japan

References

External links
 Supercomputing Research and Education Facility, NUST
 

 
Supercomputing
Supercomputer sites
Information technology in Pakistan